Idaea nephelota is a species of moth of the  family Geometridae. It is found in Australia.

Sterrhini
Moths of Australia
Moths described in 1888